Law enforcement in Switzerland is mainly a responsibility of the 26 cantons of Switzerland, who each operate cantonal police agencies. Some cities also operate municipal police agencies as provided for by cantonal law.

The federal government provides specialised services and is responsible for the protection of the Swiss border. Throughout Switzerland, the police may be reached by the emergency telephone number 1-1-7.

Requirements 
The requirements to be an officer in Switzerland vary by canton, whose responsibility it is to institute the police service, some of the requirements include a complete high school education or 3 year vocational education, aged approximately 20–30 years of age, absence of a criminal record, completion of military service, a minimum height requirement, a Category B driver's licence, computer and keyboard literacy, foreign language skills, proper health and ocular health status, and Swiss citizenship.

Law enforcement agencies

Federal
The federal government does not run a general purpose law enforcement agency. National-level law enforcement coordination is provided by a board of cantonal police commanders.

The Federal Office of Police, an organisation belonging to the Federal Department of Justice and Police, coordinates international operations and may request cantonal police support for criminal investigations conducted under federal jurisdiction (such as with respect to organised crime, money laundering and terrorism). The Office's investigative arm is the Federal Criminal Police, which operates a small special operations unit, Task Force TIGRIS, whose existence was not made public until 2009.

The Federal Department of Finance is responsible for the Swiss Border Guard Corps. The military of Switzerland, led by the Federal Department of Defence, Civil Protection and Sports, operates a professional military security service and a military police service.

These services, as well as the armed forces in general, can be tasked to support the cantonal police forces in situations where civilian police resources are insufficient, such as catastrophes or large-scale unrest. In this case, the military serves under cantonal civilian responsibility and command.

An actual Swiss Railway Police did not exist until the late 1990s. Prior to this, a number of train attendants were sworn in, equipped with a sidearm and ordered to provide security services in addition to their main duties. In the early 1990s, internal employees were recruited into a security force called Bahnpolizei (Bapo) or Railway Police, responsible for the safety on the S-Bahn, the public suburban railway network in Zurich. Its officers were equipped with a baton and a pepper spray but were not allowed to carry a firearm and had very limited authority. In the meantime, the Swiss Federal Railways SBB and Securitas AG established the Public Transport Security Services Securitrans AG, where the Bapo was subsequently embedded in. With the passage of the Federal Act on the Security Units of Public Transport Companies in 2010, the Railway Police returned under SBB’s umbrella and was renamed to Transport Police for legal reasons. In 2012, the Ordinance on the Security Units of Public Transport Companies was issued that extended the Transport Police's authority and allowed its officers to carry a sidearm. Today, the Transport Police and Securitrans coexist with different fields of duty.

Cantonal
The 26 cantonal police agencies and numerous municipal police agencies are the backbone of Swiss law enforcement. They are not subordinate to federal authorities. Their commanding officers report to the head of the respective cantonal or municipal department of police, who is a member of the cantonal or municipal governing council.

Police training is conducted in cantonal service academies and at the Interkantonale Polizeischule Hitzkirch, a joint police academy of twelve police agencies established in 2007.

Private 
Several private security services such as Securitas AG and Protectas exist in Switzerland. Their agents (except those of the railway police service as noted above) do not have any law enforcement authority, such as the power of arrest, beyond that of ordinary citizens.

Prisons

Switzerland has 124 detention facilities with a total capacity of up to 6,736 detainees, all operated by the Swiss cantons. The smallest prison is the Untersuchungsgefängnis Trogen with a capacity of two detainees.

See also 
 Crime in Switzerland

Notes and references

External links
Swiss Police portal

 
National Central Bureaus of Interpol